Laura J. Niedernhofer (born October 6, 1964) is an American professor of biochemistry, molecular biology, and biophysics, with expertise in the fields of DNA damage, repair, progeroid syndromes and cellular senescence

Education and career
Niedernhofer studied from 1981 to 1985 at Duke University graduating with a B.S. chemistry, from 1989 to 1990 at Georgetown University School of Medicine graduating with an M.S. in physiology, and from 1990 to 1992 at the University of Alabama at Birmingham with training in medicine. At Nashville's Vanderbilt University School of Medicine she studied from 1992 to 1996 graduating with a Ph.D. in biochemistry and from 1996 to 1998 graduating with an M.D. As a postdoc from 1999 to 2003, she studied mouse genetics under the supervision of Jan Hoeijmakers at Rotterdam's Erasmus University Medical Center. Niederhofer was from 2003 to 2012 an associate professor of microbiology and molecular genetics at the University of Pittsburgh and from 2012 to 2018 an associate professor of molecular medicine at the Florida campus of Scripps Research. At the University of Minnesota from 2018 to the present, she is a full professor of biochemistry, molecular biology, and biophysics and director of the Institute of the Biology of Aging and Metabolism, as well head of the Niedernhofer Lab.

In 2017 Niedernhofer was one of fifteen recipients of the Glenn Award for Research in Biological Mechanisms of Aging. In 2018 she received the Vincent Cristofalo Rising Star Award in Aging Research from the American Federation for Aging Research.

Selected publications

References

External links
 
 
 

1964 births
Living people
American molecular biologists
American biochemists
American geneticists
Biogerontologists
20th-century American women scientists
21st-century American women scientists
Duke University alumni
Georgetown University School of Medicine alumni
Vanderbilt University School of Medicine alumni
University of Pittsburgh faculty
Scripps Research faculty
University of Minnesota faculty